Arthur Goullet (1894–1978) was a British stage, film and television actor. He played the role of Sebastian Moran in the 1937 Sherlock Holmes film Silver Blaze.

Selected filmography
 Down River (1931)
 A Gentleman of Paris (1931)
 Red Wagon (1933)
 It's a King (1933)
 The Crimson Candle (1934)
 Colonel Blood (1934)
 King Solomon's Mines (1937) as Sylvestra Getto
 Silver Blaze (1937)
 Wanted! (1937)
 Hey! Hey! USA (1938)
 Strange Boarders (1938)
 For Freedom (1940)
 Caravan (1946)

References

Bibliography
 Scott Allen Nollen. Sir Arthur Conan Doyle at the Cinema. McFarland, 1996.

External links

1894 births
1978 deaths
British male television actors
British male film actors
British male stage actors
Male actors from London